Philip Lawson may refer to:

 Philip Lawson (author), pseudonym of Michael Bishop in collaboration with Paul Di Filippo
 Philip Lawson (composer), composer, arranger and baritone singer